Edward Dobrowolski is an electrical engineer with the North American Electric Reliability Corporation in Atlanta, Georgia. He was named a Fellow of the Institute of Electrical and Electronics Engineers (IEEE) in 2015 for his work in developing interactive control center technology.

References

20th-century births
Living people
American electrical engineers
Fellow Members of the IEEE
Year of birth missing (living people)
Place of birth missing (living people)